This is a list of musical artists that are of North Korean nationality.

North Korean musicians

North Korean songwriters and composers

Music bands, groups and orchestras

See also
 List of South Korean musicians
 List of musicians
 Culture of North Korea
 Music of North Korea
 Korean music

References

 
Lists of musicians
North Korean musicians